Ion Pleșca is a Moldovan politician.

Biography 

He has been a member of the Parliament of Moldova since 2009.

External links 
 Site-ul Parlamentului Republicii Moldova
 Alianţa Moldova Noastră

References

1957 births
Living people
Our Moldova Alliance politicians
Moldovan MPs 2009–2010

Recipients of the Order of Honour (Moldova)